Poul Byrge Poulsen (11 April 1915 – 7 December 1994) was a Danish rower. He competed at the 1936 Summer Olympics in Berlin with the men's eight, where they were eliminated in round one.

References

1915 births
1994 deaths
Danish male rowers
Olympic rowers of Denmark
Rowers at the 1936 Summer Olympics
People from Frederikssund Municipality
European Rowing Championships medalists
Sportspeople from the Capital Region of Denmark